John Watson is a British film producer.

Early life and education

Watson, the son of the Somerset cricketer of the same name, was born in the village of Poyntington in Dorset, in South West England.

He was educated at Sherborne School, an independent school for boys in the town of Sherborne in Dorset, followed by Churchill College at the University of Cambridge.

Career
Watson's breakthrough came in 1991, when two films he produced were simultaneous hits: Robin Hood: Prince of Thieves (which he also co-wrote), starring Kevin Costner and Morgan Freeman; and Backdraft, starring Kurt Russell and Robert De Niro, directed by Ron Howard. He then quickly leaped into television in 1992 where his Trilogy Entertainment Group organization had signed with RHI Entertainment.

Branching into television in the mid-1990s, Watson executive-produced over 300 hours of network and cable television; 7 seasons of The Outer Limits (Showtime), 4 seasons of Poltergeist: The Legacy (Showtime), 1 season of Fame LA (Syndication) and 1 season of The Twilight Zone (UPN).

Watson developed the CBS series, The Magnificent Seven, on which he was the sole showrunner for 2 seasons, and co-created and executive-produced the TNT and Bravo series Breaking News. TV movies and mini-series he has executive-produced; Carrie (NBC), Houdini and Buffalo Soldiers (TNT), Brother's Keeper (USA), Peter Benchley's Creature, Taking of Pelham 123 (ABC), and Lifepod (FOX).

Watson produced (with Julian Adams and Pen Densham) the submarine thriller Phantom from RCR Media Group, Trilogy Entertainment Group and Solar Filmworks. Phantom was written and directed by Todd Robinson, and stars Ed Harris, David Duchovny and William Fichtner.

Watson is a tenured professor at The USC School of Cinematic Arts, and holder of the Cubby Broccoli Endowed Chair.

Writing credits
The Zoo Gang – with Pen Densham - 1985
A Gnome Named Gnorm - with Pen Densham - 1990
Robin Hood: Prince of Thieves – Story – Screenplay with Pen Densham 1991
Taking Liberty - with Pen Densham 1993
The Magnificent Seven - with Pen Densham (TV series) - 1998

Producing credits
Multiple films for Insight Productions, Watson's production company with Pen Densham.
Life Times Nine (Oscar nominated short) - 1973
Don't Mess with Bill (Oscar nominated short) - 1980 
The Zoo Gang - 1985
The Kiss - 1988
A Gnome Named Gnorm - 1990
Robin Hood: Prince of Thieves - 1991
Backdraft - 1991
Taking Liberty - (executive producer) - 1993
Space Rangers (TV series) (executive producer) - 1993
Lifepod (TV movie) (executive producer) - 1993
Blown Away - 1994
Tank Girl - 1995
Moll Flanders - 1996
Larger Than Life - 1996
Fame L.A. (TV series) - (executive producer) - 1997
Buffalo Soldiers (TV movie) - (executive producer) - 1997
The Taking of Pelham One Two Three (TV movie) - (executive producer) - 1998
Mr. Headmistress (TV movie) - (co-producer) - 1998
The Magnificent Seven (TV series) - (executive producer) - 1998
Creature (TV movie) - (executive producer) - 1998
Houdini (TV movie) - (executive producer) - 1998
Poltergeist: The Legacy (TV series) - (executive producer) - 1996-1999
The Outer Limits (TV series) - (executive producer)- 1995-2001
The Dangerous Lives of Altar Boys - (executive producer) - 2002
My Brother's Keeper (TV movie) - (executive producer) - 2002
Breaking News (TV series) - (executive producer) - 2002
Carrie (TV movie) - (executive producer) - 2002
The Twilight Zone (TV series) - (executive producer) - 2003
Just Buried - 2008
Phantom - with Pen Densham and Julian Adams - 2013

References

External links

English film producers
Living people
Year of birth missing (living people)